The Sylyard, later Seylyiard, later Seyliard Baronetcy, of Delaware in the County of Kent, was a title in the Baronetage of England.  It was created on 18 June 1661 for John Sylyard.  The second and third Baronets used the spelling Seylyiard.  The fourth Baronet used the spelling Seyliard.  The title became extinct on his death in 1701 at the age of one.

Sylyard, later Seylyiard, later Seyliard baronets, of Delaware (1661)

Sir John Sylyard, 1st Baronet ( – 1667)
Sir Thomas Seylyiard, 2nd Baronet ( – 1692)
Sir Thomas Seylyiard, 3rd Baronet ( – 1701)
Sir John Seyliard, 4th Baronet (1700–1701)

References

Extinct baronetcies in the Baronetage of England
1661 establishments in England